is a Japanese mixed martial artist currently competing as a bantamweight in the Rizin Fighting Federation. A professional competitor since 2012, he formerly competed for Road Fighting Championship, Fighting Network Rings and DEEP. 

He is a former Fighting Network Rings 132-pound champion. He holds notable wins over Ulka Sasaki, Kyoji Horiguchi and Manel Kape. The Fight Matrix had him ranked as the #7 bantamweight in the world in October 2019.

Aside from his mixed martial arts career, he is also a popular YouTuber in Japan, having gained over 616,000 subscribers in less than a year and having accumulated over 441 million views since June 2019.

He is the younger brother of Mikuru Asakura.

Early life
In elementary school Kai trained karate, as well as spending three years training volleyball.

Kai and his brother Mikuru Asakura spent much of their childhood getting involved in numerous street fights. The brothers would often fight each other as well, to which Kai attributes his toughness as a professional mixed martial artist. As they were entering their adolescent years, at the suggestion of a therapist, their mother enrolled them into boxing classes.  

Whilst a third year student at Aichi Prefectural Toyohashi Technical High School, his brother took him to the Zen Dokai Toyohashi Dojo, which was Kai’s first introduction to mixed martial arts. It was at the insistence and encouragement of his brother, Mikuru, that he did take his interest in fighting.

Mixed martial arts career

Amateur career
Kai Asakura, as well as his brother Mikuru, fought their first amateur MMA fights under the Outsider brand of Fighting Network Rings. The Outsider brand was geared towards problematic youth, with focus on rehabilitating delinquents, criminals and gang members with MMA. He would later fight professionally with Outsider.

After winning his first amateur bout, against Dai Aoki, with a first round armbar, Asakura lost his next two fights. He would then go on a five-fight winning streak, which gave him a shot at the Outsider Amateur 132 lbs Championship. During Outsider 33, Asakura beat Masamichi Yoshino in the semifinals and Yoichi Oi in the finals, both by way of TKO.

Early career
Kai Asakura began his professional career under the banner of DEEP, when he faced a fellow debutante Tomoya Suzuki. Asakura won the bout via a first round TKO.

He would then fight with Fighting Network Rings new brand of MMA events named Outsider, after a three-year hiatus. He faced Satoshi Date, whom he defeated in the second round by TKO. Two months later he faced Keigo Takayama winning the fight after just 40 seconds by way of TKO. Two months later he fought a debuting Jung Bin Choi, earning his first career submission, forcing Choi to tap to a D'Arce choke in the first round. Asakura's next opponent was Jong Hyun Kwak. Asakura again ended the fight in the first round, winning through a TKO.

Fighting with Road Fighting Championship, Asakura fought Liu Xiaoyang, who he beat by an RNC in the first round. Fighting for the Fighting Network Rings 60 kg title, Asakura faced Yoichi Oi. He won the title fight in the first round, defeating Oi at the very end of the first round by TKO. Asakura's next opponent was Alateng Heili, who was riding a six-fight winning streak. Asakura won the fight after 29 seconds, hitting Heili with a short left hook, followed by a knee strike. Asakura suffered his first career loss to Je Hoon Moon during Road FC 39, losing by way of TKO.

Rizin Fighting Federation
Kai Asakura made his Rizin debut on 29th December 2017, during RIZIN Fighting World Grand Prix 2017. Asakura was scheduled to fight the ZST Flyweight Champion Seiichiro Ito. Ito suffered a nasal fracture before the bout, and was replaced by Kizaemon Saiga. Kai won the fight in the second round after knocking Saiga out with a grounded knee.

During Rizin 10, Asakura faced one of the world's foremost bantamweights, Manel Kape. After suffering an early flash knockdown, Asakura rallied and improved as the fight went on. He would win a closely contested split decision, which would be named as a Fight of the Month nominee for May of 2018 by MMA Junkie.

Asakura was next scheduled to fight Thanongsaklek Tiger Muay Thai at Rizin 11. The fight was subsequently rescheduled for Rizin 13, after Asakura injured his right knee. At Rizin 13 Asakura exploited the Thai native's lacking ground game, and won a unanimous decision.

During RIZIN Heisei's Last Yarennoka! Kai Asakura was given the opportunity to avenge his sole career loss to Je Hoon Moon. Asakura won the rematch by way of a unanimous decision.

Kai Asakura's next fight was to be at Rizin 15 against Ulka Sasaki. Sasaki had to pull out due to injury and was replaced by Justin Scoggins. Scoggins would then himself pull out of the bout after he suffered a meniscus and ligament tear in his knee.

His next fight was scheduled for Rizin 18 as a non-title bout against the Rizin bantamweight champion Kyoji Horiguchi. Asakura would feint Horiguchi backward and landed a big right hand as Horiguchi was blitzing in. Following up with knees and punches, Asakura was awarded a first round TKO win in a stunning upset over the champ.

Two months later he faced Ulka Sasaki during Rizin 19. Asakura would completely dominate Sasaki, stunning the veteran with a right hand, and following up with grounded knees and soccer kicks. This would earn him a TKO win, as Sasaki was unable to continue due to a broken jaw.

Title reign
This six-fight winning streak gave Asakura a chance to fight for the Rizin bantamweight strap, in a rematch against Kyoji Horiguchi during Rizin 20. Horiguchi would pull out of the bout due to a knee injury and vacated the belt. Asakura would face Manel Kape in a rematch for the vacant Rizin bantamweight title. Kape knocked Kai down twice in the beginning of the second round which forced the referee to stop the fight, earning Kai his second professional loss.

Asakura faced Hiromasa Ougikubo for the Rizin Bantamweight Championship at Rizin 23. He claimed the championship via first-round knockout.

Asakura was scheduled to fight the former Lightweight King of Pancrase Shoji Maruyama during Rizin 24 – Saitama. Asakura won the fight by a first round TKO. Mid-way through the round, Asakura dropped Maruyama to the canvas with a quick left-right combination, and followed it up with several soccer kicks.

Asakura was scheduled to make his first title defense in a rematch with the former Rizin Bantamweight champion Kyoji Horiguchi during Rizin 26 – Saitama. He lost the fight by a first-round TKO.

Rizin Bantamweight Grand Prix 2021 
Asakura faced Shooto Watanabe in the opening round of the Bantamweight Grand Prix at Rizin 28 on June 13, 2021.  He won the fight by a first-round technical knockout.

Asakura faced Alan Yamaniha in the quarterfinals on September 19, 2021 at Rizin 30. He won the fight by unanimous decision.

In the semi-finals, Asakura faced Kenta Takizawa on December 31, 2021 at Rizin 33. He won the fight by unanimous decision, and advanced to the tournament finals, where he faced Hiromasa Ougikubo. He lost the bout via unanimous decision, becoming the runner up in the Grand Prix.

Continued bantamweight career 
Asakura was expected to face the undefeated Ji Yong Yang at Rizin 36 on July 2, 2022. Asakura withdrew from the fight on June 30, as he had re-injured his right hand.

Asakura is scheduled to face Yuki Motoya at Rizin 42 on May 6, 2023.

Championships and achievements

Mixed martial arts
Rizin Fighting Federation
Rizin Bantamweight Championship (one time)
Fighting Network Rings
RINGS 60kg Championship (One time)
Amateur Outsider Bantamweight Championship (One time)

Awards
eFight.jp
August 2019 Fighter of the Month

Mixed martial arts record
 

|-
|Loss
|align=center|19–4
|Hiromasa Ougikubo
|Decision (unanimous)
| rowspan=2|Rizin 33
| rowspan=2|
|align=center|3
|align=center|5:00
| rowspan=2|Saitama, Japan
|
|-
|Win
|align=center|19–3
|Kenta Takizawa
|Decision (unanimous)
|align=center|3
|align=center|5:00
|
|-
|Win
|align=center|18–3
|Alan Yamaniha
|Decision (unanimous)
|Rizin 30
|
|align=center|3
|align=center|5:00
|Saitama, Japan
|
|-
|Win
|align=center|17–3
|Shooto Watanabe
|TKO (punches)
|Rizin 28
|
|align=center|1
|align=center|3:22
|Tokyo, Japan
|
|-
|Loss
|align=center|16–3
|Kyoji Horiguchi
|TKO (punches)
|Rizin 26
|
|align=center|1
|align=center|2:48
|Saitama, Japan
|
|-
|Win
|align=center|16–2
|Shoji Maruyama
|TKO (punches and soccer kick)
|Rizin 24
|
|align=center|1
|align=center|2:37
|Saitama, Japan
|
|-
|Win
|align=center|15–2
|Hiromasa Ougikubo
|KO (knee and soccer kicks)
|Rizin 23
|
|align=center|1
|align=center|4:31
|Yokohama, Japan
|
|-
|Loss
|align=center|14–2
|Manel Kape
|TKO (punches)
|Rizin 20
|
|align=center|2
|align=center|0:38
|Saitama, Japan
|
|-
|Win
|align=center|14–1
|Ulka Sasaki
|TKO (broken jaw)
|Rizin 19
|
|align=center|1
|align=center|0:54
|Osaka, Japan
|
|-
|Win
|align=center|13–1
|Kyoji Horiguchi
|KO (punches)
|Rizin 18
|
|align=center|1
|align=center|1:08
|Nagoya, Japan
|
|-
|Win
|align=center|12–1
|Jae Hoon Moon
|Decision (unanimous)
|Rizin: Heisei's Last Yarennoka!
|
|align=center|3
|align=center|5:00
|Saitama, Japan
|
|-
|Win
|align=center|11–1
|Thanongsaklek Chuwattana
|Decision (unanimous)
|Rizin 13
|
|align=center|3
|align=center|5:00
|Saitama, Japan
|
|-
|Win
|align=center|10–1
|Manel Kape
|Decision (split)
|Rizin 10
|
|align=center|3
|align=center|5:00
|Fukuoka, Japan
|
|-
|Win
|align=center|9–1
|Kizaemon Saiga
|TKO (punches and knee)
|Rizin World Grand Prix 2017: 2nd Round
|
|align=center|2
|align=center|2:34
|Saitama, Japan
|
|-
|Loss
|align=center|8–1
|Jae Hoon Moon
|KO (punches)
|Road FC 39
|
|align=center|3
|align=center|2:38
|Seoul, South Korea
|
|-
|Win
|align=center|8–0
|Alateng Heili
|TKO (punches)
|Road FC 37
|
|align=center|1
|align=center|0:29
|Seoul, South Korea
|
|-
|Win
|align=center|7–0
|Yoichi Oi
|TKO (punches)
|The Outsider 42
|
|align=center|1
|align=center|4:52
|Aichi, Japan
|
|-
|Win
|align=center|6–0
|Xiaoyang Liu
|Submission (rear-naked choke)
|Road FC 32
|
|align=center|1
|align=center|1:49
|Changsha, China
|
|-
|Win
|align=center|5–0
|Jong Hyun Kwak
|TKO (punches)
|The Outsider 38
|
|align=center|1
|align=center|4:04
|Tokyo, Japan
|
|-
|Win
|align=center|4–0
|Jung Bin Choi
|Submission (D'Arce choke)
|The Outsider 37
|
|align=center|1
|align=center|2:21
|Shizuoka, Japan
|
|-
|Win
|align=center|3–0
|Keigo Takayama
|TKO (punches)
|The Outsider 36
|
|align=center|1
|align=center|0:40
|Tokyo, Japan
|
|-
|Win
|align=center|2–0
|Satoru Date
|TKO (punches)
|The Outsider 35
|
|align=center|2
|align=center|3:36
|Tokyo, Japan
|
|-
|Win
|align=center|1–0
|Tomoya Suzuki
|Submission (armbar)
|Deep - Cage Impact 2012
|
|align=center|1
|align=center|2:34
|Shizuoka, Japan
|
|-
|}

|-
|Win
|align=center|1–0
|Hikaru Saito
|Submission (rear-naked choke)
|E.P.W. Heroes
| 
|align=center|1
|align=center|0:23
|Matsuyama, Japan
|
|-

Amateur mixed martial arts record

|-
|Win
|align=center| 8–2
|Yoichi Oi
|TKO (Punches)
|Outsider 33
|December 7, 2014
|align=center|1
|align=center|N/A
|Yokohama, Kanagawa, Japan
|Won the Outsider Bantamweight Tournament Championship.
|-
|Win
|align=center| 7–2
|Masamichi Yoshino
|TKO (Punches)
|Outsider 33
|December 7, 2014
|align=center|1
|align=center|0:22
|Yokohama, Kanagawa, Japan
|Outsider Bantamweight Tournament Semi-finals.
|-
|Win
|align=center| 6–2
|Takayuki Okugi
|TKO (Punches)
|Outsider 32
|September 7, 2014
|align=center|1
|align=center|0:23
|Kadoma, Osaka, Japan
|
|-
|Win
|align=center| 5–2
|Masaya Kamide
|Decision (Unanimous)
|Outsider 31
|June 22, 2014
|align=center|2
|align=center|3:00
|Tokyo, Japan
|
|-
|Win
|align=center| 4–2
|Kenta Tanoue
|TKO (Punches)
|Outsider 30
|April 6, 2014
|align=center|1
|align=center|1:07
|Tokyo, Japan
|
|-
|Win
|align=center| 3–2
|Shota Kaneko
|TKO (Punches)
|Outsider 29
|February 16, 2014
|align=center|1
|align=center|1:09
|Tokyo, Japan
|
|-
|Win
|align=center| 2–2
|Masamune
|Decision (Unanimous)
|Outsider 28
|December 7, 2013
|align=center|2
|align=center|3:00
|Kadoma, Osaka, Japan
|
|-
|Loss
|align=center| 1–2
|Ryota Kitamura
|Decision (Unanimous)
|Outsider 27
|September 9, 2013
|align=center|2
|align=center|3:00
|Osaka, Japan
|
|-
|Loss
|align=center| 1–1
|Riku Shibuya
|Decision (Unanimous)
|Outsider 25
|April 21, 2013
|align=center|2
|align=center|3:00
|Tokyo, Japan
|
|-
|Win
|align=center| 1–0
|Dai Aoki
|Submission (Armbar)
|Outsider 24
|February 10, 2013
|align=center|1
|align=center|0:31
|Tokyo, Japan
|
|-
|}

See also
 List of current Rizin FF fighters
 List of male mixed martial artists

References 

1993 births
Living people
People from Aichi Prefecture
Japanese male mixed martial artists
Mixed martial artists utilizing Kyokushin kaikan
Mixed martial artists utilizing boxing
Japanese male karateka
Japanese YouTubers